The 2021 Světec train crash was a collision of two freight trains, which occurred at Světec railway station in Světec, Czech Republic on 4 April 2021 at 14:16 CEST. An express freight train, no. 54334, operated by ORLEN Unipetrol Doprava (UNIDO) and hauled by a CZ Class 753.7, collided with a continuous freight train, no. 66403, operated by ČD Cargo (ČDC) and hauled by a CZ Class 123. The driver of the UNIDO train, which was carrying tank cars filled with propane and butane, died upon impact. The driver of the ČD Cargo train, which was carrying coal, saved himself by jumping out of the locomotive. A fire broke out on one of the locomotives, and 9 firefighter units and an air ambulance responded to the accident. According to preliminary information, the railway signalling had worked correctly, so the accident was probably caused by the UNIDO train driver killed in the crash.

The total damage was calculated at about 50 million CZK (34 mil. CZK to the UNIDO train, 9 mil. CZK to the ČDC train, 4.5 mil. CZK to the infrastructure).

References 

Světec train crash
Accidents and incidents involving České dráhy
Svetec train crash
Derailments in the Czech Republic
Svetec train crash
Ústí nad Labem Region
Train collisions in the Czech Republic